The Benin women's national football team represents Benin in international women's football. It is governed by the Benin Football Federation. It never reached the African Championship or the World Cup finals.

Benin's participation in the African Championships consists of only one qualification tournament, in 2006. Benin beat Malawi at home, and therefore moved through the first qualification round. They then drew 1–1 with Ivory Coast, and won in a penalty shootout. In the second round, Benin met Mali, and lost both matches.

Benin also entered the 2008 African Championships, but then pulled out before the tournament began. Their home defeat to Mali was therefore the last match Benin has played in so far.

History

2006 African Women's Championship
The national team of Benin played its first match against Malawi on February 19, 2006; in the qualifying tournament of the 2006 African Women's Championship, which was held in Nigeria. Benin won the match by a score of 1–0, but the goalscorer was unknown. The second leg was played on February 26, 2006; this time it ended with a 0–0 draw. Benin advanced to the First Round due to an aggregate score of 1–0.
In the First Round, Benin was paired with Ivory Coast and drew both matches by scores of 1–1. In the second match when it was still 1–1 after extra time, Benin won in a penalty shoot-out by a score of 4–3 and they advanced to the Second Round.
In the Second Round, Benin met Mali. In the first leg, on July 22, 2006; Benin lost the match 3–1, and their only goal in the game was scored by Bouraïma Bathily, the only known goalscorer for Benin. The second leg, played on August 6, 2006, was a 1–0 loss and also so far the last match that Benin played, in which they lost by one goal. Thus, Benin was eliminated from the tournament by an aggregate score of 4–1.

2008 Olympic Games qualifying
Benin was paired with Namibia in the preliminary round for the 2008 Olympic Games Football Tournament in China, but they withdrew.

2008 African Women's Championship
Once again Benin withdrew from a tournament, after being paired with Guinea in the First Round of the 2008 African Women's Championship qualification. The tournament was held in Equatorial Guinea.

Team image

Nicknames
The Benin women's national football team has been known or nicknamed as the " ".

Home stadium
The Benin women's national football team plays their home matches at the Stade de l'Amitié.

Rivalries

Results and fixtures

The following is a list of match results in the last 12 months, as well as any future matches that have been scheduled.

Partial results are shown in parentheses.

Legend

2023

Coaching staff

Current coaching staff

Manager history

 Unknown (2006)
Vacant (20??–2021)
Symphorien Téhou(2021–)

Players

Current squad
 Caps and goals accurate up to and including 30 October 2021.

Recent call-ups
The following players have been called up to a Benin  squad in the past 12 months.

Records

Individual records

*Active players in bold, statistics correct as of 6 September 2021.

Most appearances

Top goalscorers

Competitive record

FIFA Women's World Cup

*Draws include knockout matches decided on penalty kicks.

Olympic Games

Africa Women Cup of Nations

African Games

WAFU Women's Cup record

Head-to-head record

Honours

Continental

Regional

See also
 Sport in Benin
 Football in Benin
 Women's football in Benin
 Benin national football team
 Africa Women Cup of Nations
 List of women's national association football teams

References

External links

African women's national association football teams
Benin women's national football team